Wang Ji-Hye (born December 29, 1985) is a South Korean actress best known for her roles in Protect the Boss, Friend, Our Legend, The President and Personal Taste.

Filmography

Television series

Film

Music video

Awards and nominations

References

External links
 
 
 
 

1985 births
Living people
South Korean television actresses
South Korean film actresses
Konkuk University alumni